Clare Quilty was an American musical group formed in Charlottesville, Virginia, in the United States, in 1994. Clare Quilty began as a pop-punk band but later material veered more toward electronica and trip hop. The band is named after a character in Vladimir Nabokov's 1955 novel, Lolita.

The group scored two chart hits in 2003, "Dex Dubious" (DBC Mix) (US #33 Club Play) and "Tremble" (US #44 Club Play).

Clare Quilty's final album, Face the Strange, was produced by Richard Morel and was released by DCide Records in summer 2005. The band retired in January 2006.

Band members
Jenn Rhubright – vocals
Michael Rodi – guitar, vocals
Chris Ruotolo – bass, vocals
Juliet Trail – keyboards, vocals
Jimmy J. Amburgey – drums

Discography

 Suga-Lik (November 4, 1997)
 Strong (May 9, 2000)
 Face the Strange (June 7, 2005)

References

American experimental musical groups
Trip hop groups
Musical groups from Virginia